La Notte is a live album by Norwegian pianist Ketil Bjørnstad recorded in Norway in 2010 and released on the ECM label.

Reception

The Allmusic review by Thom Jurek awarded the album 4 stars stating "Bjørnstad has always valued subtlety and suggestion over frenetic engagement on his recordings. That is certainly true here, but he is also a wise bandleader: he chose these players for their myriad abilities to dialogue kinetically, listen deeply, and respond powerfully whenever the music dictated, and he was correct in doing so across the board. La Notte is rich, deep, and wonderful".

The All About Jazz review by Hrayr Attarian said that "Much like the works of the cineastes that have inspired Bjørnstad's stimulating and captivating composition, its intellectual and emotional impact lasts long after the disc has stopped spinning".

The Independent'''s Nick Coleman gave the album 3 stars and said "Familiar Bjornstad characteristics prevail: romantic tone, sedate tempo, shallow trajectory, much thought over what often sounds like uncomplicated harmony".

Track listingAll compositions by Ketil Bjørnstad''
 "I" - 6:53   
 "II" - 8:23   
 "III" - 4:36   
 "IV" - 5:27   
 "V" - 8:31   
 "VI" - 6:44   
 "VII" - 7:04   
 "VIII" - 7:00

Personnel
Ketil Bjørnstad - piano
Andy Sheppard - tenor saxophone, soprano saxophone
Eivind Aarset - guitars, electronics
Anja Lechner - cello
Arild Andersen - bass
Marilyn Mazur - drums, percussion

References

2013 live albums
2013 in Norwegian music
ECM Records live albums
Ketil Bjørnstad live albums
Albums produced by Manfred Eicher